The Theatre of the Relatively Talentless (TORT) is a student theatrical company that puts on musicals and other performances written, produced, directed and performed by law students of the University of Minnesota Law School.  TORT is a campus life program through the University of Minnesota Student Activities Office and operates under the purview of the Law School.  Formed in 2002, it "provides law students and faculty with a desperately needed creative outlet."

Membership
TORT is open to "all law students without regard to race, religion, color, sex, national origin, disability, age, veteran status, creed, marital status, public assistance status, sexual orientation, class standing, political preferences, bluebooking skill, or ability to use the term "" in a sentence."  TORT is governed year-round by an executive board consisting of two producers, a director, a music director, a technical director, a head writer, a treasurer, a head costumer, and a choreographer.  As TORT has become more established, the cast has grown to more than 70 members.  Participants are often known as the TORTfeasors.

Musical

The musical is an annual event held in late March or early April of each year. The event draws over a thousand audience members each year. The show is notable for its cameos by law school professors, deans, staff, alumni and other distinguished members of the Minnesota legal community.

The theme is chosen shortly after the last year's show, and a draft of the script is completed over the summer.  Auditions are held during the fall semester, and rehearsals begin at the start of spring semester.

Cast members may be assigned as leads, featured singers, featured dancers, or members of the chorus.  Chorus members may also have speaking lines, and often impersonate law school professors, staff, or administrators. TORT has its own pit orchestra, also composed entirely of law students, which provides musical accompaniment for the show.

Executive Board members for the following year are elected on the night of each final performance.

Past shows
2003: Wizard of Fritz – a spoof on The Wizard of Oz, performed in the Open Book Loft in Minneapolis, Minnesota.
2004: Law Wars – a spoof on Star Wars, performed in the Coffman Memorial Union Theatre on the Minneapolis campus of the University of Minnesota.
2005: Walter Wonka & the Lawyer Factory – a spoof on Willy Wonka & the Chocolate Factory, performed in the St. Paul Student Center Theatre on the St. Paul campus of the University of Minnesota.
2006: West Bank Story – a spoof on West Side Story, performed in the St. Paul Student Center Theatre at the University of Minnesota.
2007: Frankenlaw – a spoof on Frankenstein, performed in the Pantages Theatre in downtown Minneapolis.
2008: Robin Hood, Esq. – a spoof on Robin Hood, performed in the Pantages Theatre.
2009: It's A Wonderful Law School – a spoof on It's a Wonderful Life, performed in the Pantages Theatre.
2010: A Midsemester Night's Dream – a spoof on A Midsummer Night's Dream, performed in the Pantages Theatre.
2011: Harry Torter and the Magical Law School – a spoof on Harry Potter, performed in the Pantages Theatre.
2012: Alawddin: The Tale of 1,001 All-Nighters – a spoof on Aladdin, performed in the Pantages Theatre. 
2013: Back to the Future Interest – a spoof on Back to the Future, performed in the Pantages Theatre.
2014:  Clue: a Murder Mystery in Mondale – a spoof on Clue (film), performed in the Pantages Theatre.
2015:  Froze-in – a spoof on Frozen (film), performed in the Pantages Theatre.
2016:  Minnesota Jones and the Law School of Doom – a spoof on Indiana Jones and the Temple of Doom, performed in the Pantages Theatre.
2017: The TORT Producers – a spoof on The Producers (musical), performed in the Ted Mann Concert Hall.
2018: Top Gunner – a spoof on Top Gun, performed in the Ted Mann Concert Hall.
2019: Tale as Old as Time - a spoof on Beauty and the Beast, performed in the Pantages Theater.
2020: Lord of the Ranks, tragically cancelled due to some kind of worldwide pandemic or something.
2021: Super Smash Gophers, performed via online simulcast and drive-in experience at Graco Park.
2022: Gunner's New Groove, performed in the St. Paul Student Center Theatre at the University of Minnesota.

Cameos

2003
VIP
Former vice president Walter Mondale ('56)
Minnesota Supreme Court Associate Justice Paul H. Anderson ('68)
Federal District Court Judge Joan N. Ericksen ('81)
Law School
Dean Alex Johnson
Professor Ann Burkhart
Professor Guy-Uriel Charles
Professor Jim Chen
Professor John Matheson
Professor Judith T. Younger

2004
VIP
Former vice president Walter Mondale ('56)
Then-Attorney General of Minnesota Mike Hatch ('73)
Federal District Court Judge James M. Rosenbaum ('69)
Hennepin County District Court Judge (then Chief Judge) Kevin S. Burke ('75)
Law School
Dean Alex Johnson
Professor Dale Carpenter
Professor Maury Landsman
Professor John Matheson
Susan Gainen, director, Career Center

2005
VIP
Former vice president Walter Mondale ('56)
Then-Hennepin County District Attorney Amy Klobuchar (currently a U.S. Senator representing Minnesota)
Hennepin County District Court Judge Stephen Aldrich ('71)
Law School
Dean Alex Johnson
Associate Dean of Students Erin Keyes
Associate Dean Jim Chen
Professor Bradley Clary
Professor Laura Cooper
Professor Maury Landsman
Professor John Matheson
Professor Judith T. Younger
Collins Byrd, then-Director of Admissions
Susan Gainen, director, Career & Professional Development Center
Steve Marchese, director, Career & Professional Development Center
Linda Lokensgard, director, Building & Events

2006
VIP
Former Minnesota Attorney General Mike Hatch ('73)
Federal District Court Judge John R. Tunheim ('80)
Law School
Dean Alex Johnson
Associate Dean of Students Erin Keyes
Professor John Matheson
Professor Judith T. Younger
Professor Jim Chen
Susan Gainen, director, Career & Professional Development Center
Vic Massaglia, Career Advisor in the Career & Professional Development Center

2007
VIP
Former vice president Walter Mondale ('56)
Federal District Court Judge John R. Tunheim ('80)
Federal District Court Judge James M. Rosenbaum ('69)
Minnesota Supreme Court Associate Justice Paul H. Anderson ('68)
Minnesota Supreme Court Associate Justice Lorie Skjerven Gildea
Law School
Co-Dean Fred Morrison
Co-Dean Guy-Uriel Charles
Professor John Matheson
Professor Judith T. Younger
Professor Laura Cooper
Professor Ruth Okediji
Professor Stephen Befort
Professor Bradley Clary
Professor Maury Landsman
Professor Prentiss Cox
Susan Gainen, director, Career & Professional Development Center
Steven Marchese, director, Career & Professional Development Center
Vic Massaglia, Career Advisor, Career & Professional Development Center

2008
VIP
Federal District Court Judge James M. Rosenbaum ('69)
Minnesota Supreme Court Associate Justice Paul H. Anderson ('68)
Minnesota Supreme Court Associate Justice Lorie Skjerven Gildea
Mike Ciresi ('71)
Law School
Co-Dean Fred Morrison
Co-Dean Guy-Uriel Charles
Professor John Matheson
Professor Judith T. Younger
Professor Claire Hill
Professor Richard Frase
Professor Stephen Befort
Professor Heidi Kitrosser
Professor Laura Cooper
Professor Prentiss Cox
Susan Gainen, director, Career & Professional Development Center
Steven Marchese, director, Career & Professional Development Center
Vic Massaglia, Career Advisor, Career & Professional Development Center
TORT Alumni
Kirby Petersen ('07)
Trevor Helmers ('07)

Alumni
Past TORTfeasors have formed an alumni group called TORT Alumni Relationship Taskforce (TART). This group is responsible for organizing the alumni afterparty for the Saturday night performance of each year's musical. It also hosts alumni events over the course of the year, and maintains alumni contact information, in order to help the TORT Executive Board with recruiting VIPs, selling tickets, and generating sponsors.

References

External links
University of Minnesota Law School Theatre of the Relatively Talentless
University of Minnesota Law School Riesenfeld Rare Books, World Theater Day post

University of Minnesota